Hervé Schreiner (born November 29, 1974) is a former professional footballer who played as a midfielder.

See also
Football in France
List of football clubs in France

References

External links
Hervé Schreiner profile at chamoisfc79.fr

1974 births
Living people
French footballers
Association football midfielders
FC Sochaux-Montbéliard players
Chamois Niortais F.C. players
Paris FC players
Ligue 1 players
Ligue 2 players
Stade Poitevin FC players
Sportspeople from Troyes
Footballers from Grand Est